is a manga artist (born December 19). Part of a duo including herself and Mitsuba Kurenai. This is the pen name used for writing extremely adult-oriented yaoi-stories.  Real names are Masaki Sano (佐野 真砂輝 Sano Masaki) and Kyou Watanabe (わたなべ 京 Watanabe Kyō). This duo also still works for the dōjinshi market and has published some dōjinshi of  their own work.

Manga works
Level-C - Kairaku no Houteishiki
West End

Person's name Masaki Sano and Kyou Watanabe
Tokyo Guardian
Fire Emblem
Fire Emblem Shiranhen/Soumeihen
goo Higashinihondaishinsai support Wallpaper FIRE EMBLEM
Fire Emblem Gaiden
Platinum
GPX Grand prix exceed
Gadget
Z/ETA
Z/ETA (Drama CD)
Shiranuimonogatari Hakatayouiki

External links
Futaba Aoi's homepage  (in Japanese)
goo Higashinihondaishinsai support Wallpaper Masaki Sano&Kyou Watanabe FIRE EMBLEM(in Japanese)

Year of birth missing (living people)
Living people
People from Tokyo
Manga artists from Tokyo